Darin Henry (born ) is an American television writer. He has written for many different television series, including Seinfeld, Futurama, The War at Home and Oddballs. He also wrote a Big Finish Doctor Who audio called The Game. He wrote an episode for Shake It Up and is the co-executive producer for the series.

Writing credits
My Family
"While you Weren't Sleeping" (series 5)
"Neighbour Wars" (series 8)
(Also for the last episode of series 8 Henry was credited as an associate producer with Paul Minnett & Brian Leveson.)
"The Guru" and "Kenzo's Project" (co-written with Tom Anderson) (series 9)
"Mary Christmas" (co-written with Paul Minnett & Brian Leveson) (series 10)
"Darts All, Folks" (series 11)

Not Going Out
"Amy" (co-written with Lee Mack)
"Dancing" (co-written with Lee Mack)

Seinfeld
"The Van Buren Boys" (series 8)
"The Slicer" (with Gregg Kavet and Andy Robin) (series 9)
"The Bookstore" (series 9)
"The Clip Show, Part 1" (series 9)

Futurama
"The Problem with Popplers"

The War at Home
"It's a Living"
"Three's Company"

Shake It Up 
 "Whodunit Up?" (season 2) 
 "Spirit It Up" (season 3)
 "Clean It Up" (season 3)

K.C. Undercover
 "Off the Grid" (season 1)

Oddballs
 "Wanted Dead or Fly"
 "Line Cutters"
 "Pillow Fight Club"
 "Almost Home Alone"
 "Partners"

References

External links
 

Year of birth missing (living people)
Living people
American television writers
American male television writers